Armani Exchange Presents Tiësto In Search of Sunrise Summer Tour 08 is a partnership tour between Tiësto and Armani Exchange.

The purpose of this junction between both is to promote themselves, Armani will offer exclusive apparel to Tiësto and a special limited edition release containing 3 CDs of his In Search of Sunrise 7: Asia compilation which is due June 10. The tour took place in North America on May 23 and ended on July 4. Cary Brothers, José González and Tegan & Sara performed live along Tiësto at the Bonnaroo Music and Arts Festival in Manchester, Tennessee and Topher Jones who recently joined Black Hole Recordings was invited to open some sets for Tiësto. On June 22 at the Constitution Plaza in Connecticut; former member of Gabriel & Dresden, Dave Dresden, Second Sun, Randy Boyer, and Kered & Kiraly played along Tiësto.

Tour dates

See also
 Armani Exchange
 In Search of Sunrise (series)
 In Search of Sunrise 7: Asia

References

2008 concert tours
Tiësto concert tours